Sir Robert de Ashton, also called "Robert Assheton" or "Robert de Assheton" (died 1385), was a civil, military, and naval officer under Edward III of England who achieved distinction alike in court and camp, by land and by sea.

Family

Ashton was of the great northern family of Ashton or Assheton, of Ashton-under-Lyne, Lancashire.

Robert was also twice-married. By his first wife, Elizabeth de Gorges, Heiress of Tothill, he left a son, Thomas, and a daughter, Eleanor. His second wife was the widow of Lord Matthew de Gomey, and after Ashton's death married Sir John Tiptoft, knt., and died in 1417.

Career

Sir Robert is first mentioned in 1324, as a member of the parliament of Westminster, and afterwards occupying positions of great importance and trust. In 1359, he was governor of 'Guynes' near Calais; in 1362 he was Lord Treasurer of England; in 1368 he had the custody of the castle of Sandgate near Calais with the lands and revenue thereto belonging; in 1369 he was admiral of the Narrow Seas; in 1372 he was Justiciar of Ireland, and in 1373 again lord treasurer of England and King's Chamberlain. In 1375, he became chancellor of the exchequer, and held that office until the death of Edward III in 1377, when he was succeeded by Simon de Burley. From 1376 to 1381 he was Constable of Portchester Castle, which he reinforced by building "Ashton's tower".

The new king did not discard his father's old servant, and in 1380 Ashton was appointed constable of Dover and warden of the Cinque Ports. He died at Dover Castle 9 Jan. 1384–5, and was buried in the church there, to which he had previously presented a large bell.

References

English knights
1385 deaths
Year of birth unknown
14th-century English people
14th-century English Navy personnel
Robert
Lord High Treasurers of England
Justiciars of Ireland